John J. Kempf (May 4, 1857??) was an American shoemaker, businessman, and politician.  He was the 14th and 16th state treasurer of Wisconsin—he was removed from office by the governor in 1904 during his first term and then won election to return to office later that year.  He also served in the Wisconsin State Senate, representing the north side of the city of Milwaukee.

Biography
Kempf was born on May 4, 1857, in Granville, Wisconsin. He attended Spencerian Business College.

Career
Kempf served as a Milwaukee alderman from 1887 to 1888. He was a member of the Wisconsin State Senate and the Register of Deeds of Milwaukee County before serving as Treasurer of Wisconsin from 1903 to 1904 and again from 1905 to 1907. Additionally, he was a member of the Republican State Central Committee from 1900 to 1903. On August 30, 1904, the Governor of Wisconsin Robert M. La Follette removed Kempf from office and appointed Thomas M. Purtell acting treasurer.

Electoral history

Wisconsin State Senate (1888)

| colspan="6" style="text-align:center;background-color: #e9e9e9;"| General Election, November 6, 1888

Wisconsin State Treasurer (1902, 1904)

| colspan="6" style="text-align:center;background-color: #e9e9e9;"| General Election, November 4, 1902

| colspan="6" style="text-align:center;background-color: #e9e9e9;"| General Election, November 8, 1904

References

External links
The Political Graveyard

1857 births
Year of death missing
People from Granville, Wisconsin
Politicians from Milwaukee
Wisconsin city council members
State treasurers of Wisconsin
Republican Party Wisconsin state senators